The Intersection for the Arts Literary Series is the longest running literary series outside of an academic institution in the state of California. Organized and maintained by Intersection for the Arts in San Francisco, the literary series presents regular readings by emerging local writers and prominent authors.

Independent Press Spotlight 
In recent years, Intersection for the Arts has included an Independent Press Spotlight as part of their literary series, allowing editors from San Francisco literary magazines and independent publishers to talk about their work alongside readings from local authors. Publishers featured in the Independent Press Spotlight include
AK Press
The Believer
City Lights Publishers,
ColorLines Magazine,
Fourteen Hills,
Heyday Books,
LiP Magazine,
Manic D Press,
McSweeney's,
Mercury House,
New American Writing,
Switchback,
Tachyon Publications,
University of California Press,
Zoetrope: All-Story,
and ZYZZYVA.

Authors 
Hundreds of authors have read at Intersection since the series began. In the last ten years, some of the more recognizable names include:

Chris Adrian
Samina Ali
Dorothy Allison
Jimmy Santiago Baca
Noel Black
Kate Braverman
Norma Cole
Bernard Cooper
Peter Coyote
Mike Davis
Aya de Leon
Nguyen Qui Duc
Roxanne Dunbar-Ortiz
Erik Ehn
Lynn Emanuel
Barry Gifford
Molly Giles
Jewelle Gomez
Guillermo Gómez-Peña
Joe Goode
Noah Eli Gordon
Philip Kan Gotanda
Thom Gunn
Lyn Hejinian
Juan Felipe Herrera
bell hooks
Naomi Iizuka
Mark Johnson
June Jordan
Uchechi Kalu
Tom Kealey
Randall Kenan
Myung Mi Kim
Paul LaFarge
Anna Livia
David Meltzer
Trinh T. Minh-ha
Mary Anne Mohanraj
José Montoya
Cherríe Moraga
Bharati Mukherjee
Tillie Olsen
Julie Orringer
Dale Pendell
Jim Powell
Kevin Powell
Barbara Jane Reyes
Joan Roughgarden
Leslie Scalapino
Aaron Shurin
Gary Snyder
Rebecca Solnit
Gary Soto
Darcey Steinke
Michelle Tea
Piri Thomas
John Trudell
Ellen Ullman
Alice Walker
Erin Cressida Wilson
Nellie Wong
Al Young
Dean Young
Daisy Zamora

References

External links
 Intersection for the Arts

Literary collaborations